Pavilhão João Rocha is a multi-sports pavilion located in Lisbon, next to the Estádio José Alvalade and it is the home of Sporting CP sports. The pavilion is named after João Rocha, a former club president who remained in office from September 1973 to October 1986. The inauguration took place on the day June 21, 2017.

History

Precedents 
In 1975, João Rocha, president of the club at the time, advanced with the project to create a sports complex near the Estádio José Alvalade (1956).

On October 14, 1976, the Pavilion of Alvalade was born. This was, in fact, a sports complex, with 4 thousand square meters and three enclosures: the main pavilion, with capacity for 5000 spectators, and two smaller pavilions used for training.

However, the work saw its life shortened dramatically due to the growth of the city of Lisbon and its transport network. Therefore, in September 1986, the main pavilion was demolished due to the construction of the Campo Grande Metro Station.

Facing this situation, João Rocha, still president of the club, launched a project to improve the facilities of the club. Realizing an old ambition of the Sporting fans, closed the Estádio José Alvalade through the construction of the called "new bench" and, taking advantage of the space underneath of this one, raised the Nave de Alvalade.

With capacity for 1500 spectators, Nave de Alvalade happened to be the house of the Sporting modalities, although it should be only provisional. However, the pavilion hosted numerous campaigns and events.

On January 4, 2004, Nave de Alvalade sold out for the last time with a futsal game because, together with the old stadium, it would be demolished to proceed with the project of the new José Alvalade Stadium, which did not contemplate the construction of a new pavilion for the modalities.

Need 
After the demolition of the Nave de Alvalade, Sporting no longer had its own venue for its teams to compete. Despite that the new Alvalade XXI Complex contains a multi-sport building for the preparation and training of the club's athletes, the size of the adept mass and the number of sports practised in the club required a proper venue for high competition.

In addition to being aware of this need, something decisive was lacking for the realization of the work: the terrain. Although there were several alternatives and even municipalities that were willing to cede the land, it was always convinced that such work could only be done in the area of the new José Alvalade Stadium.

Therefore, until the construction of the new pavilion, the various modalities of Sporting were divided between third-party pavilions.

Bureaucratic process 
The lands formerly occupied by the former Estádio José Alvalade were eventually retained by the Lisbon Municipal Council and would eventually be earmarked for the construction of the Metropolis project. The meeting of the municipal executive of Lisbon for the allotment of the land was scheduled for April 16, 2007, but was eventually postponed to negotiate with the club to transfer a plot of land for the construction of a new pavilion.

A meeting between a delegation of Sporting led by José Eduardo Bettencourt and CML was held on September 9, 2009, and it was agreed that the future pavilion would be located in the plot of land corresponding to the northern upper bench of the former Estádio José Alvalade .

On November 25, 2009, the protocol between CML and Sporting was approved in a Chamber meeting, considering the decision of the Arbitral Tribunal to order CML to compensate Sporting with a value of 23 million euros, The club claimed to have surface right. Thus, the Chamber would cede a portion of the land annexed to the Estádio José Alvalade in the amount of €5,000,000 for the construction of a sports pavilion (in addition to assets worth 18 million euros).

However, this decision of the Chamber was not finally ratified at the Municipal Assembly on 10 December 2009, and it was decided to send the protocol to a town planning commission, appointed to reassess it. On January 12, 2010, the Lisbon City Council approved the agreement between the local authority of Lisbon and Sporting.

In compliance with part of the agreement between the municipality and Sporting, the Lisbon City Council approved, on 27 January 2010, the elaboration of the Alvalade XXI Detail Plan, which contemplates the construction of the pavilion.

On November 3, 2010, the Lisbon City Council voted in favor of the Alvalade XXI Detail Plan, which included the new Sporting pavilion. The autarky thus gave the green light to the project which came to be the subject of a final analysis by the Commission for Coordination of Regional Development of Lisbon and Vale do Tejo, which would give the last and decisive opinion on 25 March 2011.

As part of the public discussion period of the Alvalade XXI Detail Plan, CML held a public clarification meeting on 30 May 2011, approving it on 26 October 2011. However, a final step was missing. The approval by the Municipal Assembly, which would only happen on March 12, 2013.

Mission Pavilion 
After becoming club president in the 2013 elections, Bruno de Carvalho, launched, after the approval of the Municipal Assembly of the Alvalade XXI Detail Plan, the Mission Pavilion in order to raise financial resources for the construction of the João Rocha Pavilion.

The final objective of the Mission Pavilion was the raising of ten million euros, to be divided by the construction of the João Rocha Pavilion and the restoration of the Multidesportivo Sporting.

Opening 
The João Rocha Pavilion was inaugurated on June 21, 2017, precisely 15 years after the inauguration of the Sporting Academy in Alcochete, in a solemn institutional ceremony.

The first game held at the João Rocha Pavilion was on September 6, 2017. It was the first round of the national handball championship, where Sporting defeated AC Fafe for 30-17, with 2852 spectators.

Construction

Launch of the first stone 
On March 27, 2015, Sporting signaled the start of construction of the new pavilion. After an open training session at the José Alvalade Stadium, the ceremony for the launching of the first stone of the João Rocha Pavilion began with the official speeches of Bruno de Carvalho (Sporting president in 2015) and Fernando Medina (Vice-president of the Lisbon City Council).

On the day of the launching of the first stone, several modalities opened their doors to the members and fans, who had the opportunity to try the various modalities and also, in some cases, to train with the athletes.

Work 
The work lasted for about 22 months, integrating the normal period of inspections, extension connections and use licenses, culminating with the inauguration.

With a month of works, the land displacement was almost completed and it became possible to see the exact perimeter of Pavilion implementation.

At the end of the second month, the first concrete structures appeared in the form of the south wall and two giant cranes became part of the landscape. In the third month the western wall appeared, and the slopes of north and east earth were consolidated with concrete.

On March 23, 2016, Sporting opened the doors of the work so that fans could see closely the new house of the modalities.

During the tenth month the cover frame was erected, the walls of the internal subdivision began to be erected, and the southern basement was completed and, with eleven months of construction, the entire reinforced concrete structure was completed.

With a full year of construction, the steps of all the benches, except for South A, were complete, the layering was placed and the outer covering at the second floor level was completed.

On August 13, 2016, the second "open-day" was held, with the doors of the João Rocha Pavilion open to the club's Members and Adepts. With a year and a half of work, the first chairs appeared in the benches and began the work of placing the Portuguese sidewalk, gardens and soccer field 7.

After 22 months and 18 days of work, which corresponds to a total of 689 days, the João Rocha Pavilion was ready to be inaugurated and, thus, open its doors to athletes, members and fans of the club, assuming what was built for, to be the new home of Sporting (modalities).

References 

Sporting CP
Indoor arenas in Portugal
Handball venues in Portugal